Gustavo Dias Vaz da Conceição (born 8 March 1957 in Luanda) is a former Angolan basketball player. Conceição, a small forward, competed for Angola at the 1980 Africa Basketball championship, an event that marked Angola's debut in the African competition arena and at the 1986 FIBA World Championship.

He is a brother of Angola senior police officer Fernando Torres Vaz da Conceição aka Mussolo and of Aldemiro Justino de Aguiar Vaz da Conceição, a longtime spokesman for the President and now the President's secretary for Regional Affairs.

From December 2004 to December 2012, he served two terms as chairman of the Angolan Basketball Federation. As of May, 2005, Gustavo da Conceição has been serving a second term as chairman of the Angolan Olympic Committee. Conceição is also a member of the Angolan parliament for the ruling party MPLA.

See also
Angolan Basketball Federation

References

1957 births
Living people
Angolan men's basketball players
Basketball players from Luanda
C.D. Primeiro de Agosto men's basketball players
Small forwards
Members of the National Assembly (Angola)
MPLA politicians